Taylor Mikael McNamara (born December 4, 1987) is a Canadian soccer player who plays for Oakville Blue Devils FC.

Career

Youth and Amateur
McNamara attended Iona Catholic Secondary School in his native city, Mississauga. He played for the junior club team of professional side Toronto Lynx, helping the team win its division and advance to the semifinals of the North American championships as well as advance to the title game of the Dallas Cup, before coming to the United States in 2005 to play college soccer at the University at Albany, SUNY. With Albany, McNamara was named to the America East Academic Honor Roll as a freshman in 2005, was named to the America East Commissioner’s Academic Honor Roll and his team's MVP as a sophomore in 2006 and as a junior in 2007, and was an ESPN All-Academic All-American selection.

During his college years McNamara also played four seasons in the USL Premier Development League for the Toronto Lynx, scoring 6 goals in 56 appearances for the club.

Professional
McNamara turned professional in 2011 when he signed with Dayton Dutch Lions of the USL Professional Division. He made his professional debut on April 23, 2011 in a 3-2 loss to Rochester Rhinos. McNamara re-signed with Dayton in February 2012.

References

External links
 Dayton Dutch Lions profile
 Albany bio

1987 births
Living people
Canadian soccer players
Canadian expatriate soccer players
Albany Great Danes men's soccer players
Toronto Lynx players
Dayton Dutch Lions players
Expatriate soccer players in the United States
USL League Two players
Soccer players from Mississauga
USL Championship players
League1 Ontario players
Blue Devils FC players
Association football midfielders